Tomáš Macháč (born 13 October 2000) is a Czech professional tennis player. He achieved his career-high Association of Tennis Professionals (ATP) singles ranking of world No. 97 on 12 December 2022 and doubles ranking of world No. 427 on 1 August 2022.
He is currently the No. 2 Czech player.

Professional career

2020: Grand Slam debut, first Challenger title 
Macháč won his first ATP Challenger singles title at the 2020 Koblenz Open in February.

Macháč played his very first Grand Slam qualification at 2020 French Open and defeated all three opponents without losing a set before losing the competitive first round against Taylor Fritz in five sets.

2021: First Grand Slam win, top 150 & Olympics debut
Macháč did exactly the same thing at the next  Grand Slam at the 2021 Australian Open losing just 14 games to qualify  where he defeated Mario Vilella Martínez before losing in the second round to world No. 10 Matteo Berrettini in four sets.

He made his ATP debut at the 2021 Murray River Open with direct entry into main draw, losing in the first round to James Duckworth.

In March, Macháč won his second ATP Challenger singles title at the 2021 Nur-Sultan Challenger II. As a result, he entered the top 150 at career-high of No. 137 on 8 March 2021.

He qualified to represent Czechia at the 2020 Summer Olympics where he reached the second round by defeating João Sousa.

In August, he reached his second Challenger final of 2021 at the 2021 Svijany Open where he lost to Alex Molčan in 58 minutes.

2022: Masters 1000 debut & first win, Top 100
Macháč made the final of the 2022 Traralgon International Challenger and won, earning his first Challenger title on an outdoor hard court. As a result, he entered the top 130 on 10 January 2022. The following week he qualified for the 2022 Australian Open main draw, defeating Camilo Ugo Carabelli, Yuki Bhambri, and Jesper de Jong en route. He defeated Juan Manuel Cerúndolo before falling to Maxime Cressy in the second round. As a result, he moved to a new singles career high of No. 116 on 31 January 2022.

In March, he made his Masters 1000 debut as a qualifier at the 2022 BNP Paribas Open in Indian Wells and recorded his first win at this level defeating Alexei Popyrin. He lost to World No. 1 Daniil Medvedev.

In August he won his fourth Challenger title at the 2022 Kozerki Open in Poland and moved 32 positions up to No. 126 on 22 August 2022. In the same month, he qualified at the US Open making his debut at this Major.

Following a final at the Challenger in Helsinki he reached a new year-end career-high of No. 104 on 21 November 2022. A week later, he further reached the top 100 at No. 98 with a quarterfinal showing at the Challenger in Andria, Italy.

Personal life
Macháč is dating fellow Czech tennis player Kateřina Siniaková.

Challenger and Futures finals

Singles: 11 (8 titles, 3 runner–ups)

Doubles: 6 (6 runner–ups)

Performance Timeline

Current through the 2023 Australian Open

Record against top 10 players
Macháč's record against players who have been ranked in the top 10, with those who are active in boldface. Only ATP Tour main draw matches are considered:

Notes

References

External links
 
 
 

2000 births
Living people
Czech male tennis players
People from Beroun
Olympic tennis players of the Czech Republic
Tennis players at the 2020 Summer Olympics
Sportspeople from the Central Bohemian Region
21st-century Czech people